Essendon may refer to:

Australia
Electoral district of Essendon
Electoral district of Essendon and Flemington
Essendon, Victoria
Essendon railway station
Essendon Airport
Essendon Football Club in the Australian Football League

United Kingdom
Essendon, Hertfordshire
Baron Essendon